Boulevard was a Finnish rock band, which was founded in 1983, by Kyösti Laihi and Erkki Korhonen. The band mainly  played at clubs and bars. After their start, they were joined by Matti Auranen and Tuomo Tepsa. Other members of the band included Juha Lanu, Kari Vehkaluoto and Jari Puhakka.

The group became best known for representing Finland at the Eurovision Song Contest on two consecutive years
 1987 - Vicky Rosti's backing group with the song Sata salamaa (A hundred lightnings), finished 15th place with 32 points.
 1988 - Performers of the song Nauravat silmät muistetaan (Laughing eyes are remembered), finished 20th place with 3 points.

The group disbanded in 1994.

Discography 
 Sata salamaa (1987)
 Nauravat silmät muistetaan (1988)
 Nauravat silmät  (1988)

External links
 Boulevard: Take him home, the Eurovision Song Contest Trial Presentation YLE Living Archive

Finnish schlager groups
Boulevards in Finland
Eurovision Song Contest entrants for Finland
Eurovision Song Contest entrants of 1987
Eurovision Song Contest entrants of 1988